Zelleria is a genus of moths of the family Yponomeutidae.

Species

Zelleria abisella - Chrétien, 1910 
Zelleria afflictella - Walker, 1863 
Zelleria alterella - Chrétien, 1910 
Zelleria aphrospora - Meyrick, 1892 
Zelleria araecodes - Meyrick, 1892 
Zelleria arizonica - Braun, 1940 
Zelleria bradleyi - Moriuti, 1963 
Zelleria callidoxa - Meyrick, 1892 
Zelleria chalcoleuca - Meyrick, 1914 
Zelleria cirrhoscia - Meyrick, 1931 
Zelleria citrina - Meyrick, 1892 
Zelleria coniostrepta - Meyrick, 1938 
Zelleria cremnospila - Lower, 1900 
Zelleria cryptica - Meyrick, 1913 
Zelleria cyanoleuca - (Lower, 1908) 
Zelleria cynetica - Meyrick, 1892 
Zelleria deformis - Meyrick, 
Zelleria elongata - Moriuti, 1963 
Zelleria euthysema - Turner, 1923 
Zelleria gracilariella - Busck, 1904 
Zelleria haimbachi - Busck, 1915 
Zelleria hemixipha - Lower, 1900 
Zelleria hepariella - Stainton, 1849 
Zelleria impura - Staudinger, 1880 
Zelleria insignipennella - Stainton, 1849 
Zelleria isopyrrha - Meyrick, 1922 
Zelleria leucoschista - Meyrick, 1931 
Zelleria leucostrota - Meyrick, 1929 
Zelleria loranthivora - Meyrick, 1930 
Zelleria maculata - Philpott, 1930 
Zelleria malacodes - Turner, 1938 
Zelleria memorella - Meyrick, 1892 
Zelleria metriopa - Meyrick, 1933 
Zelleria mystarcha - Meyrick, 1892 
Zelleria oleastrella - Milliére, 1867 
Zelleria orthopleura - Turner, 1923 
Zelleria panceuthes - Turner, 1923 
Zelleria parnassiae - Braun, 1940 
Zelleria pistopis - Meyrick, 1931 
Zelleria plumbeella - Staudinger, 1870 
Zelleria porphyraula - Meyrick, 1927 
Zelleria proterospila - Meyrick, 1892 
Zelleria pyri - Clarke, 1942 
Zelleria pyroleuca - Meyrick, 1892 
Zelleria restrictellus - Chrétien, 1915 
Zelleria ribesella - Busck, 1904 
Zelleria rorida - Philpott, 1918 
Zelleria scambota - Meyrick, 1928 
Zelleria semitincta - Philpott, 1930 
Zelleria sigillata - Meyrick, 1892 
Zelleria sphenota - (Meyrick, 1889)
Zelleria strophaea - Meyrick, 
Zelleria stylograpta - Meyrick, 1907 
Zelleria wolffi - Klimesch, 1983

Yponomeutidae